This is a list of number theory topics, by Wikipedia page. See also:

List of recreational number theory topics
Topics in cryptography

Divisibility

Composite number
Highly composite number
Even and odd numbers
Parity
Divisor, aliquot part
Greatest common divisor
Least common multiple
Euclidean algorithm
Coprime
Euclid's lemma
Bézout's identity, Bézout's lemma
Extended Euclidean algorithm
Table of divisors
Prime number, prime power
Bonse's inequality
Prime factor
Table of prime factors
Formula for primes
Factorization
RSA number
Fundamental theorem of arithmetic
Square-free
Square-free integer
Square-free polynomial
Square number
Power of two
Integer-valued polynomial

Fractions

Rational number
Unit fraction
Irreducible fraction = in lowest terms
Dyadic fraction
Recurring decimal
Cyclic number
Farey sequence
Ford circle
Stern–Brocot tree
Dedekind sum
Egyptian fraction

Modular arithmetic

Montgomery reduction
Modular exponentiation
Linear congruence theorem
Method of successive substitution
Chinese remainder theorem
Fermat's little theorem
Proofs of Fermat's little theorem
Fermat quotient
Euler's totient function
Noncototient
Nontotient
Euler's theorem
Wilson's theorem
Primitive root modulo n
Multiplicative order
Discrete logarithm
Quadratic residue
Euler's criterion
Legendre symbol
Gauss's lemma (number theory)
Congruence of squares
Luhn formula
Mod n cryptanalysis

Arithmetic functions

Multiplicative function
Additive function
Dirichlet convolution
Erdős–Kac theorem
Möbius function
Möbius inversion formula
Divisor function
Liouville function
Partition function (number theory)
Integer partition
Bell numbers
Landau's function
Pentagonal number theorem
Bell series
Lambert series

Analytic number theory: additive problems

Twin prime
Brun's constant
Cousin prime
Prime triplet
Prime quadruplet
Sexy prime
Sophie Germain prime
Cunningham chain
Goldbach's conjecture
Goldbach's weak conjecture
Second Hardy–Littlewood conjecture
Hardy–Littlewood circle method
Schinzel's hypothesis H
Bateman–Horn conjecture
Waring's problem
Brahmagupta–Fibonacci identity
Euler's four-square identity
Lagrange's four-square theorem
Taxicab number
Generalized taxicab number
Cabtaxi number
Schnirelmann density
Sumset
Landau–Ramanujan constant
Sierpinski number
Seventeen or Bust
Niven's constant

Algebraic number theory
See list of algebraic number theory topics

Quadratic forms

Unimodular lattice
Fermat's theorem on sums of two squares
Proofs of Fermat's theorem on sums of two squares

L-functions

Riemann zeta function
Basel problem on ζ(2)
Hurwitz zeta function
Bernoulli number
Agoh–Giuga conjecture
Von Staudt–Clausen theorem
Dirichlet series
Euler product
Prime number theorem
Prime-counting function
Meissel–Lehmer algorithm
Offset logarithmic integral
Legendre's constant
Skewes' number
Bertrand's postulate
Proof of Bertrand's postulate
Proof that the sum of the reciprocals of the primes diverges
Cramér's conjecture
Riemann hypothesis
Critical line theorem
Hilbert–Pólya conjecture
Generalized Riemann hypothesis
Mertens function, Mertens conjecture, Meissel–Mertens constant
De Bruijn–Newman constant
Dirichlet character
Dirichlet L-series
Siegel zero
Dirichlet's theorem on arithmetic progressions
Linnik's theorem
Elliott–Halberstam conjecture
Functional equation (L-function)
Chebotarev's density theorem
Local zeta function
Weil conjectures
Modular form
modular group
Congruence subgroup
Hecke operator
Cusp form
Eisenstein series
Modular curve
Ramanujan–Petersson conjecture
Birch and Swinnerton-Dyer conjecture
Automorphic form
Selberg trace formula
Artin conjecture
Sato–Tate conjecture
Langlands program
modularity theorem

Diophantine equations

Pythagorean triple
Pell's equation
Elliptic curve
Nagell–Lutz theorem
Mordell–Weil theorem
Mazur's torsion theorem
Congruent number
Arithmetic of abelian varieties
Elliptic divisibility sequences
Mordell curve
Fermat's Last Theorem
Mordell conjecture
Euler's sum of powers conjecture
abc Conjecture
Catalan's conjecture
Pillai's conjecture
Hasse principle
Diophantine set
Matiyasevich's theorem
Hundred Fowls Problem
1729

Diophantine approximation

Davenport–Schmidt theorem
Irrational number
Square root of two
Quadratic irrational
Integer square root
Algebraic number
Pisot–Vijayaraghavan number
Salem number
Transcendental number
e (mathematical constant)
pi, list of topics related to pi
Squaring the circle
Proof that e is irrational
Lindemann–Weierstrass theorem
Hilbert's seventh problem
Gelfond–Schneider theorem
Erdős–Borwein constant
Liouville number
Continued fraction
Mathematical constant (sorted by continued fraction representation)
Khinchin's constant
Lévy's constant
Lochs' theorem
Gauss–Kuzmin–Wirsing operator
Minkowski's question mark function
Generalized continued fraction
Kronecker's theorem
Thue–Siegel–Roth theorem
Prouhet–Thue–Morse constant
Gelfond–Schneider constant
Equidistribution mod 1
Beatty's theorem
Littlewood conjecture
Discrepancy function
Low-discrepancy sequence
Illustration of a low-discrepancy sequence
Constructions of low-discrepancy sequences
Halton sequences
Geometry of numbers
Minkowski's theorem
Pick's theorem
Mahler's compactness theorem
Mahler measure
Effective results in number theory
Mahler's theorem

Sieve methods
 Brun sieve
 Function field sieve
 General number field sieve
 Large sieve
 Larger sieve
 Quadratic sieve
 Selberg sieve
 Sieve of Atkin
 Sieve of Eratosthenes
 Sieve of Sundaram
 Turán sieve

Named primes

Chen prime
Cullen prime
Fermat prime
Sophie Germain prime, safe prime
Mersenne prime
New Mersenne conjecture
Great Internet Mersenne Prime Search
Newman–Shanks–Williams prime
Primorial prime
Wagstaff prime
Wall–Sun–Sun prime
Wieferich prime
Wilson prime
Wolstenholme prime
Woodall prime
Prime pages

Combinatorial number theory

Covering system
Small set (combinatorics)
Erdős–Ginzburg–Ziv theorem
Polynomial method
Van der Waerden's theorem
Szemerédi's theorem
Collatz conjecture
Gilbreath's conjecture
Erdős–Graham conjecture
Znám's problem

Computational number theory
Note: Computational number theory is also known as algorithmic number theory.

Residue number system
Cunningham project
Quadratic residuosity problem

Primality tests

Prime factorization algorithm
Trial division
Sieve of Eratosthenes
Probabilistic algorithm
Fermat primality test
Pseudoprime
Carmichael number
Euler pseudoprime
Euler–Jacobi pseudoprime
Fibonacci pseudoprime
Probable prime
Baillie–PSW primality test
Miller–Rabin primality test
Lucas–Lehmer primality test
Lucas–Lehmer test for Mersenne numbers
AKS primality test

Integer factorization

Pollard's p − 1 algorithm
Pollard's rho algorithm
Lenstra elliptic curve factorization
Quadratic sieve
Special number field sieve
General number field sieve
Shor's algorithm
RSA Factoring Challenge

Pseudo-random numbers

Pseudorandom number generator
Pseudorandomness
Cryptographically secure pseudo-random number generator
Middle-square method
Blum Blum Shub
ACORN
ISAAC
Lagged Fibonacci generator
Linear congruential generator
Mersenne twister
Linear-feedback shift register
Shrinking generator
Stream cipher

see also List of random number generators.

Arithmetic dynamics

Aliquot sequence and Aliquot sum dynamics
Abundant number
Almost perfect number
Amicable number
Betrothed numbers
Deficient number
Quasiperfect number
Perfect number
Sociable number
Collatz conjecture
Digit sum dynamics
Additive persistence
Digital root
Digit product dynamics
Multiplicative digital root
Multiplicative persistence
Lychrel number
Perfect digital invariant
Happy number

History

Disquisitiones Arithmeticae
"On the Number of Primes Less Than a Given Magnitude"
Vorlesungen über Zahlentheorie
Prime Obsession

Number theory
 
Number theory